John Lewley Cornforth CBE (2 September 1937 – 5 May 2004) was an architectural historian with a particular interest in the history of English country houses.  He was the author of many books and articles, and architectural editor of Country Life from 1967 to 1977.

Early life
Cornforth was born at Haywood Abbey in Staffordshire, an only child of parents with private means.  His childhood friends included Patrick Anson, later 5th Earl of Lichfield, at nearby Shugborough Hall.  He took no interest in country pursuits – riding or shooting, cricket or golf – but enjoyed looking at Country Life from before he could read.

He was educated at Repton School and then studied history at Corpus Christi College, Cambridge, where he was influenced by art historian Michael Jaffé.

Career
After university, Cornforth worked as a volunteer in the British Museum in London, and started to write articles for Country Life, joining the staff at the magazine in 1961.  Its architectural editor Christopher Hussey, encouraged Cornforth to write a book with architect Oliver Hill on 17th-century country houses, published in 1966 as English Country Houses: Caroline, 1625–1685 .  Cornforth followed Hussey's successor Mark Girouard as architectural editor at Country Life in 1967.  He stepped down in 1977 to concentrate on his book writing, and was succeeded by Marcus Binney.  He retired from Country Life in 1993 but continued to write books and articles.  He wrote for Country Life for over 40 years, with a bibliography extending to over 50 pages.

The classic houses of the 17th and 18th centuries were his passion: he had little interest in Victorian houses, and disliked the 1930s Surrealist reinterpretation of Edwin Lutyens's Monkton House in Sussex for Edward James, by Kit Nicholson and Hugh Casson, with the help of Salvador Dalí.

Cornforth joined the Historic Buildings Committee of the National Trust in 1965.  At a time when country houses were under substantial threat, Cornforth was involved in vetting the many houses that were offered to the National Trust.  He became a member of the Historic Buildings Council for England in 1971.  He was influential figure behind the scenes, on practical measures and taxation.  He also wrote  Country Houses in Britain, Can They Survive? in 1974, the same year as the Destruction of the Country House exhibition at the V&A.

He also took an interest in interior decoration of the houses under the care of the National Trust, and was influenced by the interior decorator John Fowler, of Colefax and Fowler.  Cornforth and Fowler wrote English Decoration in the 18th Century, published in 1974.  Cornforth was also involved in the creation of new British galleries at the Victoria and Albert Museum.

From 1968 until 2001 he served as a trustee of the Marc Fitch Fund and was its chairman for many years. This charity is concerned with funding research and publication in English local history, archaeology and related subjects. When in 2001 the Fund's council members proposed a fitting tribute on his retirement, Cornforth put forward the idea of a book of inventories to provide a primary resource for "the interpretation of the historic interior". The book was in preparation at the time of his death and what was to be a tribute became also a memorial to his life's work. As the book's dust-wrapper states: "John Cornforth's hope was that this publication would revitalise the study of the great house in the eighteenth century. As we leaf through the book on a journey of discovery it is as if he is still present, at our elbow."

Library 
In 2004 Cornforth's collection of books was bequeathed to the National Trust and subsequently transferred to the Paul Mellon Centre. Around eight hundred books were added to the Paul Mellon Centre's library and significantly increased the library's holdings of publications on history of the country house, including those in Northern Ireland, and 18th-century decorative arts.

In February 2016, the Paul Mellon Centre held an exhibition entitled John Cornforth: A Passion for Houses: Material on the Georgian Town House from the Cornforth Library Donation which highlighted some of the significant items from John Cornforth's collection.

Personal life
He became a Commander of the Order of the British Empire in 2001.  He never married, but kept a convivial flat in Marylebone, and worshipped at the Anglo-Catholic church St Mary's, Bourne Street, near Sloane Square.   Amongst his friends were Anne, Countess of Rosse (wife of Michael Parsons, 6th Earl of Rosse), Rupert Alec-Smith, and Gervase Jackson-Stops, David Mlinaric, Wilson Rockefeller and Martin Drury.

Selected works
 Attingham Park: Shropshire. London: National Trust, 1970 (with notes on the pictures by St John Gore) 
 British Embassy, Paris: The house and its works of art. London: Government Art Collection, 1992 (with Mary Beal)   
 Country Houses in Britain, Can They Survive? An independent report. London: Country Life for the British Tourist Authority, 1974 
 The Country Houses of England, 1948-1998. London: Constable, 1998  
 The Country Life Picture Book of Country Houses. London: Country Life, 1963 
 Early Georgian Interiors. New Haven, Conn.; London: Yale University Press for the Paul Mellon Centre for Studies in British Art, 2004  
 English Country Houses. London: Country Life, 1955, 3 vols (with Christopher Hussey and Oliver Hill) 
 English Country Houses: Caroline, 1625–1685. London: Country Life, 1966 (with Oliver Hill)  
 English Decoration in the 18th Century. London: Barrie & Jenkins, 1974  (with John Fowler)  
 English Interiors, 1790–1848: The quest for comfort. London: Barrie & Jenkins, 1978  
 The Inspiration of the Past: Country house taste in the twentieth century; with photographs by Timothy Beddow. Harmondsworth: Viking in association with Country Life, 1985  
 London Interiors: From the archives of Country Life. London: Aurum Press, 2000  
 Queen Elizabeth the Queen Mother at Clarence House. London: Michael Joseph in association with the Royal Collection, 1996  
 The Search for a Style: Country Life and architecture, 1897–1935. London: André Deutsch in association with Country Life, 1988   
 Sudbury Hall, Derbyshire. London: National Trust, 1980, reprinted 1985 (with C. St. Q. Wall)

Notes

External links
 Obituary, The Guardian, 8 May 2004 
 Obituary, The Daily Telegraph, 10 May 2004
 John Cornforth by John Stanton Ward, National Portrait Gallery

1937 births
2004 deaths
People educated at Repton School
Alumni of Corpus Christi College, Cambridge
English architecture writers
English architectural historians
British magazine writers
People from the Borough of Stafford
Commanders of the Order of the British Empire
English male non-fiction writers
Country Life (magazine) people
20th-century English male writers